Krachi East is one of the constituencies represented in the Parliament of Ghana. It elects one Member of Parliament (MP) by the first past the post system of election. Krachi East is located in the Krachi East district  of the Oti Region of Ghana.

Boundaries
The seat is located within the Krachi East District of the Volta Region of Ghana. The constituency was originally located within the Volta Region of Ghana until new Regions were created following the December 2018 referendum.

History 
The constituency was first created in 2004 by the Electoral Commission of Ghana along with 29 other new ones, increasing the number of constituencies from 200 to 230. This seat was created prior to the  Ghanaian parliamentary election in 2004 when the Krachi constituency was split into the Krachi East and the Krachi West constituencies respectively.

Members of Parliament

Elections

 

National Democratic Party

See also
List of Ghana Parliament constituencies

Notes

References 

Adam Carr's Election Archives
Ghana Home Page

Parliamentary constituencies in the Oti Region
2004 establishments in Ghana